Jung Ga-ram (born February 23, 1993) is a South Korean actor. He rose to prominence for his roles in the films 4th Place (2016) and The Poet and the Boy (2017). He is also known for his roles in television series such as Standby (2012), Mistress (2018), When the Camellia Blooms (2019), and Love Alarm (2019).

Personal life 
Jung enlisted mandatory military service on October 12, 2020. And was discharged from military service on April 11, 2022.

Filmography

Film

Television series

Web series

Awards and nominations

References

External links 
 Jung Ga-ram at Management Soop 
 
 
 

1993 births
Living people
South Korean male television actors
South Korean male film actors
Hanyang University alumni